Jamaican literature is internationally renowned, with the island of Jamaica being the home or birthplace of many important authors. One of the most distinctive aspects of Jamaican literature is its use of the local dialect — a variation of English, the country's official language. Known to Jamaicans as "patois", and now sometimes described as "nation language", this creole has become an important element in Jamaican fiction, poetry and theater.

Notable writers and intellectuals from elsewhere in the Caribbean region studied at the University of the West Indies in Kingston, including St. Lucian Nobel prize-winner, Derek Walcott, the late Guyanese historian and scholar Walter Rodney, and Grenadian poet and short story writer Merle Collins.

Folk beginnings
The tradition of storytelling in Jamaica is a long one, beginning with folktales told by the slaves during the colonial period. Jamaica's folk stories are most closely associated with those of the Ashanti tribe in West Africa, from which many of the slaves originated. Some European tales were also brought to the island by immigrants, particularly those from the United Kingdom. In folktales, the local speech style is particularly necessary. It infuses humor into the stories, and is an integral part of the retelling.

Perhaps the most popular character in Jamaican tales, Anancy (also spelled Anansi, 'Nancy Spida, and Brer Nansi) is an African spider-god who makes an appearance in tales throughout the Caribbean region. He is a trickster god, and often goes against other animal-god characters, like Tiger and Donkey, in his stories. These stories are thought to be one way the slaves told about outsmarting their owners as well.

Development of the literature
Jamaican Thomas MacDermot (1870–1933) is credited with fostering the creation of Jamaican literature (according to critic Michael Hughes,  MacDermot was "probably the first Jamaican writer to assert the claim of the West Indies to a distinctive place within English-speaking culture"), and his Becka's Buckra Baby as the beginning of modern Caribbean literature.

Jamaican-born Claude McKay (1889–1948) is credited with inspiring France's Negritude (“Blackness”) movement, as well as being a founding father of the Harlem Renaissance. Having established himself as a poet in Jamaica, he moved to the U.S. in his 20s and proceeded to travel to France, but never returned to his birthplace.

Una Marson (1905–1965) was also well known for her poetry, her activism as a feminist, and for her role as producer of the BBC literary radio programme Caribbean Voices in the 1940s. Louise Bennett-Coverley (1919–2006) was a Jamaican poet and folklorist celebrated for her unique voice as "Miss Lou". Writing and performing her poems in Jamaican patois, Bennett was instrumental in having this "dialect" of the people given literary recognition in its own right ("nation language"). Other Jamaican writers who have gained international acclaim include Hazel Dorothy Campbell (1940–2018), Mikey Smith (1954–1983) and Linton Kwesi Johnson. In 2014, Mervyn Morris was appointed Poet Laureate of Jamaica. He was succeeded in 2017 by Lorna Goodison.

Notable Jamaican writers

Opal Palmer Adisa, writer, poet, performance artist
Lindsay Barrett, poet, novelist, journalist
Edward Baugh, poet and scholar
Louise Bennett-Coverley, poet, folklorist, actress, educator
James Berry, poet, anthologist
Eliot Bliss, novelist and poet
Jonathan Braham, novelist
Erna Brodber, novelist, poet
Margaret Cezair-Thompson
Colin Channer, novelist, short-story writer
Kwame Dawes, poet, critic
Jean D'Costa, novelist, scholar
Herbert de Lisser, journalist and author
Ferdinand Dennis, novelist, journalist and broadcaster
Nicole Dennis-Benn, novelist
Marcia Douglas, novelist, poet, performer
Gloria Escoffery, painter, poet and art critic
Esther Figueroa, novelist, environmental activist, filmmaker
John Figueroa, poet, educator
Honor Ford-Smith, actress, playwright, scholar and poet
Ifeona Fulani, novelist, educator
Lorna Goodison, poet
John Hearne,  novelist, journalist and teacher
A. L. Hendriks, poet and critic
Nalo Hopkinson, science fiction writer
Marlon James, novelist
Evan Jones, poet, novelist
Linton Kwesi Johnson, poet
Barbara Lalla, novelist, scholar
Thomas MacDermot, poet, novelist and editor
Roger Mais, novelist
Rachel Manley, memoirist, poet
Una Marson, poet, playwright
Shara McCallum, poet, essayist
Diana McCaulay, novelist, short story writer, environmental activist
Claude McKay, poet and novelist
Anthony McNeill, poet
Una Marson, poet, playwright, journalist
Kei Miller, poet
Pamela Mordecai, poet, novelist, short story writer
Mervyn Morris, poet, scholar, essayist
Mutabaruka, poet
Rex Nettleford, scholar, social critic
Cyril Palmer, writer
Orlando Patterson, historical and cultural sociologist
Geoffrey Philp, poet, novelist, playwright
Velma Pollard, poet, novelist, short story writer
Patricia Powell, novelist
Claudia Rankine, poet, playwright 
V. S. Reid, novelist
Trevor Rhone, playwright and film maker
Leopold Anthony Richards, scholar, educator, author
Leone Ross, novelist, short story writer, journalist
Heather Royes, poet
Gillian Royes, novelist
Andrew Salkey, novelist, poet
Dennis Scott, poet, playwright
Olive Senior, poet, novelist, short story writer
Tanya Shirley, poet, scholar
M. G. Smith, poet
Mikey Smith, poet
Ralph Thompson, poet
Anthony C. Winkler, novelist
Sylvia Wynter, novelist, dramatist, critic, essayist
Kerry Young, novelist

See also
 List of Jamaican books
 List of Jamaican writers

References

External links
Becka’s Buckra Baby from the Digital Library of the Caribbean (1904) 
One Brown Girl and - a Jamaica Story from the Digital Library of the Caribbean (1909) 
Also in the All Jamaica Library, but not written by Thomas MacDermot, Maroon Medicine, by E. A. Dodd (listed as E. Snod) from the Digital Library of the Caribbean 

 
North American literature